The Men's marathon T12 was a marathon event in athletics at the 2000 Summer Paralympics, for visually impaired athletes. Polish champion from the 1996 Games Waldemar Kikolski successfully defended his title in a world-record time of 2:33:11. Of the nine starters, six reached the finish line.

Results

See also
 Marathon at the Paralympics

References 

Men's marathon T12
2000 marathons
Marathons at the Paralympics
Men's marathons